Mohamed Kabil (born 14 March 1927) was an Egyptian footballer. He competed in the men's tournament at the 1952 Summer Olympics.

References

External links
 
 

1927 births
Living people
Egyptian footballers
Egypt international footballers
Olympic footballers of Egypt
Footballers at the 1952 Summer Olympics
Place of birth missing (living people)
Association football midfielders
Zamalek SC players